Kahab (also Romanized as Kahāb; also known as Kakhab, Qahāb (Persian: قهاب), and Qohāb) is a village in Zanjanrud-e Pain Rural District, Zanjanrud District, Zanjan County, Zanjan Province, Iran. At the 2006 census, its population was 219, in 53 families.

References 

Populated places in Zanjan County